Tamil Nadu State Highway 81 (SH-81) is a State Highway maintained by the Highways Department of Government of Tamil Nadu. It connects Gobichettipalayam with Dharapuram in the western part of Tamil Nadu.

Route
The total length of the SH-81 is nearly 90 km. The highway merges with State Highway 172A at 85 km from Gobichettipalayam in between the towns of  Uthukuli and Kangeyam in Tirupur district.

Route: Gobichettipalayam – Kunnathur – Uthukuli – Kangeyam – Dharapuram

Destinations
The highway passes through the following places:
 Erode District – Gobichettipalayam
 Tirupur District – Uthukuli, Kangeyam, Dharapuram

Junctions  

The highway meets the following arterial roads along the way:
 State Highway 15 (Tamil Nadu) at Gobichettipalayam, Erode district
 National Highway 47 at Chengapalli, Tirupur district
 State Highway 172A between Uthukuli and Kangeyam

State highways in Tamil Nadu